Panelas is a city in the state of Pernambuco, Brazil. It is located 182.6 km away from Recife, the state capital. Panelas has an estimated (IBGE 2020) population of 26,456 inhabitants.

Economy
The main economic activities in Panelas are based in agribusiness, especially sugarcane and manioc, as well as livestock such as cattle, goats, sheep, and poultry.

Economic indicators

Economy by Sector
2006

Health indicators

References

Municipalities in Pernambuco